Randolph Carter Berkeley (January 9, 1875 – January 31, 1960) was a Major General in United States Marine Corps and Medal of Honor recipient.

Commissioned a Marine second lieutenant during the Spanish–American War, Berkeley completed over 40 years' active duty in the Marine Corps, including service at sea and in the Philippines, Cuba, Panama, China, Haiti, Nicaragua and Guam. In addition to the Medal of Honor, he was awarded the Navy Cross as commander of the 11th Regiment in Nicaragua in 1927, and the Navy Distinguished Service Medal as Chief of Staff of the 2d Marine Brigade in that country in 1928–29.

As a major Berkeley was commanding the 1st Battalion of the 2d Advanced Base Regiment when he took part in the action which earned him the United States' highest decoration on April 22, 1914. Relations between the United States and the Huerta government of Mexico had been strained for some time, and a landing force of Marines and sailors was ordered ashore at Vera Cruz after a Huerta officer had arrested several U.S. Naval personnel at Tampico. The 2nd Regiment was the first ashore, meeting resistance from Mexican troops about noon on April 21. Major Berkeley was awarded the Medal of Honor for distinguished conduct and leadership in that battle.

Early life
Randolph C. Berkeley was born on January 9, 1875, in Staunton, Virginia, where he attended grade and high school. He graduated from Potomac Academy in Alexandria, Virginia in 1891.

Military career
Berkeley was appointed a Marine second lieutenant on August 8, 1898, for service during the Spanish–American War. He was stationed at the Navy Yard, Washington, D.C., until he was honorably discharged on January 9, 1899. He returned to the Corps in April 1899, when he was appointed a first lieutenant. His subsequent promotions included: captain, July 1900; major, October 1910; lieutenant colonel, August 1916; colonel, July 1918; brigadier general, July 1930; and major general on retirement, February 1939.

In addition to his service at posts in the United States, Berkeley served on a variety of assignments at sea and abroad before the action at Vera Cruz, for which he was awarded the Medal of Honor.

Berkeley took command of the 1st Battalion, 2d Advanced Base Regiment in December 1913, in Pensacola, Florida, and sailed with it for Vera Cruz in March 1914. He returned to the United States in December 1914, and was stationed in Philadelphia, Pennsylvania, until June 1915, when he sailed for Guam to command the Marine Barracks on that island. Returning from Guam in November 1917, he served at the Marine Barracks, New York, New York, and Charleston, South Carolina, during the next two years.

Berkeley was again ordered to expeditionary duty in October 1919, serving for two years with the 1st Provisional Brigade in Haiti. After he returned from that country in November 1921, he served at New York, New York, and Norfolk and Quantico, Virginia. He completed the Field Officers Course at Quantico in August 1925, and a year of study at the Army War College, Washington, D.C., in June 1926, returning from there to Quantico as commander of the 1st Regiment. He served in that capacity for the next two years, except for the period from May to August 1927, when he was commanding the 11th Regiment in Nicaragua.

Berkeley was ordered to Nicaragua again in May 1928, serving there for a year as Chief of Staff of the 2d Marine Brigade. After his return to the United States in April 1929, he commanded the Marine Barracks at the Norfolk Navy Yard, Portsmouth, Virginia. He served in that capacity until August 1930, when he was ordered to Quantico, Virginia. There he commanded the Marine Corps Schools until November 1931, when he was again ordered to Nicaragua—this time as commander of the 2d Marine Brigade.

Berkeley returned to the United States in January 1933, and from then until May 1936, commanded the Marine Barracks in Parris Island, South Carolina. He was then ordered to Marine Corps Headquarters, Washington, D.C., where he was President of the Marine Corps Examining and Retiring Boards until December 1938. He reached the statutory retirement age in January 1939 and was placed on the retired list the following month as a major general.

Retirement
Following his retirement, Berkeley lived in Beaufort and Port Royal, South Carolina, until his death at the U.S. Naval Hospital, Beaufort, South Carolina on January 31, 1960.  Major General Berkeley was buried at Arlington National Cemetery, in Arlington, Virginia.

Berkeley was survived by his two sons, Marine Corps officers, Lieutenant General James P. Berkeley and Colonel Randolph Carter Berkeley, Jr. Colonel Berkeley was also buried in Arlington National Cemetery.

Awards and honors
MajGen Berkeley's medals and decorations include:

Medal of Honor citation
BERKELEY, Randolph Carter
Major, U.S. Marine Corps
G.O. Navy Department, No. 177
December 4, 1915

CITATION:

For distinguished conduct in battle, engagements of VERA CRUZ, April 21, and 22nd, 1914; was eminent and conspicuous in command of his battalion; was in the fighting of both days, and exhibited courage and his skill in leading his men through action. His cool judgment and courage and his skill in handling his men in encountering and overcoming the machine gun and rifle fire down Cinco de Mayo and parallel streets accounts for the small percentage of the losses of Marines under his command.

Navy Cross citation
Citation:

The President of the United States of America takes pleasure in presenting the Navy Cross to Colonel Randolph Carter Berkeley (MCSN: 0-89), United States Marine Corps, for distinguished service to the government in a duty of responsibility in command of the 11th Regiment in Nicaragua in the Spring of 1927 and later Chief of Staff to the Commanding General, during difficult and important pacification problems in connection with an insurrection in that country. Largely through his zeal, tact, energy and loyalty the successful outcome of operations in the difficult Leon and Chinandega areas was accomplished.

Namesake
The United States Navy guided missile armed destroyer  is named in honor of Major General Berkeley.

See also

 List of Medal of Honor recipients (Veracruz)

References
Inline

General

 
 
 
 . Includes Berkeley's service history with the 1st Marines.

External links
 

1875 births
1960 deaths
United States Marine Corps personnel of World War I
Burials at Arlington National Cemetery
United States Marine Corps Medal of Honor recipients
Recipients of the Navy Cross (United States)
Recipients of the Navy Distinguished Service Medal
United States Marine Corps generals
People from Staunton, Virginia
Battle of Veracruz (1914) recipients of the Medal of Honor
People from Beaufort, South Carolina
People from Port Royal, South Carolina